Ennis High School is a public high school located in the city of Ennis, Texas, in Ellis County, United States and classified as a 5A school by the UIL.  It is a part of the Ennis Independent School District located in southeast Ellis County.   
In 2015, the school was rated "Met Standard" by the Texas Education Agency.

Athletics
The Ennis Lions compete in the following sports - 

Volleyball, Cross Country, Football, Basketball, Powerlifting, Soccer, Golf, Tennis, Track, Baseball & Softball

State titles
Football - 
1975(3A), 2000(4A/D2), 2001(4A/D2), 2004(4A/D1), 2014(5A/D2)

Track: 1998 (4A)

References

External links
Ennis ISD website

Public high schools in Texas
Schools in Ellis County, Texas